List of journalists killed in 2017 is about the 71 journalists killed worldwide in 2017.

Seventy one journalists have been murdered or killed worldwide while reporting, covering an incident, or because of their status as a journalist. Audrey Azoulay, the Director-General of UNESCO condemned the killing of journalists worldwide. She also called for an investigation into the killing of journalist Naveen Gupta in the state of Uttar Pradesh, India on 30 November. Frank La Rue, the UNESCO assistant director-general for communication and information said, “On average, one journalist is murdered every four days.”

The journalists and media persons who were killed or murdered in 2017

References 

 2017
Journalists killed
List of journalists killed in 2017